Hank is both a given name and a surname.

Hank may also refer to:

In entertainment
Hank (1965 TV series), an American TV sitcom which aired on NBC from 1965 to 1966
Hank (2009 TV series), an American TV sitcom starring Kelsey Grammer which aired on ABC in 2009
Hank (album), a 1957 album by jazz saxophonist Hank Mobley
"Hank", a song by James from the album Living in Extraordinary Times

Other uses
Hank (unit of measure), a measurement of length used in the textile and meat industries
Hank (sail components), a clip by which a jib or staysail is attached to a stay
Hank, Netherlands, a village in the municipality of Altena
, a U.S. Navy destroyer

Surnames from given names